The Six Pack is a box set released in 1987 by the American rock band ZZ Top. It comprises their first five albums, plus their seventh album, El Loco (1981). All the albums except El Loco and the live side of Fandango! were remixed with new drums and guitar effects for a more "contemporary" sound, similar to ZZ Top's eighth album, Eliminator (1983). Until 2006, these remixes were the only versions of the albums available on CD.

Reception

Reviewing The Six Pack for AllMusic, Stephen Thomas Erlewine wrote: "If Six Pack just delivered the original albums, it'd be a good investment, but the studio tinkering makes this a disaster."

Later reissues
The Six Pack remixes were also used on the individual CD releases of the albums and all following compilations of the band (except the CD release of 1977's The Best of ZZ Top) for the next few years. Original mixes were first remastered for the box set Chrome, Smoke & BBQ, and its companion compilation release Rancho Texicano.

In 2006, the original mixes of Tres Hombres and Fandango! were released on CD. Some tracks from the remaining three albums were unavailable digitally in their original versions until 2013 when the albums were re-released on CD with the original mixes restored. All more recent compilations used original mixes.

Track listing

Personnel

ZZ Top 
 Billy Gibbons – guitar, vocals
 Dusty Hill - bass guitar, vocals
 Frank Beard - drums, percussion

Charts

References 

1987 compilation albums
Albums produced by Bill Ham
Warner Records compilation albums
ZZ Top compilation albums